The singly rooted hierarchy, in object-oriented programming, is a characteristic of most (but not all) OOP-based programming languages. In most such languages, in fact, all classes inherit directly or indirectly from a single root, usually with a name similar to Object; all classes then form a common inheritance hierarchy.

This idea was introduced first by Smalltalk, and was since used in most other object-oriented languages (notably Java and C#).

A notable exception is C++, where (mainly for compatibility with C and efficiency) there is no single object hierarchy.  This feature is especially useful for container libraries - they only need to allow putting an Object in a container to allow objects of any class to be put in the container.  Containers in C++ have been implemented with multiple inheritance, and with help of template-based generic programming by Bjarne Stroustrup. Other object-oriented languages without a singly rooted hierarchy include Objective-C and PHP.

See also
 Top type

References

Object-oriented programming